Renaissance College (abbreviated: RCHK) is a private independent international school run by English Schools Foundation (ESF) in Hong Kong. Located in Ma On Shan near Heng On station, Renaissance College serves primary and secondary students. The school was founded in 2006 to replace the Phoenix International School, another school run by ESF. Since its inception, the school has offered the IB Primary Years Programme, Middle Years Programme and Diploma Programme. Renaissance College began to offer the IB Career-Related Programme in 2014.

As of September 2018, Renaissance College enrolls 2,094 students. Under the Private Independent School Scheme, at least 70% of the students of Renaissance College must be Hong Kong permanent residents when at full capacity.

History 
Plans to establish Renaissance College as ESF's first private school began in 1999. Unlike other schools operated by ESF at the time, Renaissance College would not receive recurrent government subsidy. In 2001, the Education Department (now the Education Bureau) granted ESF a lot of land in Ma On Shan and in Discovery Bay to build two primary-cum-secondary schools under the Private Independent School Scheme. The Ma On Shan site would eventually become the campus of Renaissance College.

On 29 October 2001, Canadian Overseas International College closed unexpectedly due to financial difficulties. According to the school's chancellor, the September 11 attacks forced the company that funded the school to file for bankruptcy. The Education Department was unaware of the financial difficulties that Canadian Overseas International College was facing, and was only informed by the school one day before its closure. The police investigated possible fraud at the school, after complaints from some parents. Jonathan Goodman, the supervisor of the Canadian school, was arrested in December 2001 for suspected theft but was not charged.

The closure of the Canadian Overseas International College made 380 students unable to attend school. To resume tuition for the affected students, the Education Department established Phoenix International School (PIS) in 2001 as a temporary school operated by ESF. PIS occupied the former campus of Australian International School in Cheung Sha Wan and adopted the Ontario curriculum (OSSD).

The campus in Ma On Shan cost HK$297 million to build, of which HK$191.6 million was funded by the Hong Kong Government. Phoenix International School merged with Renaissance College after the latter began operating in August 2006. The first cohort of Renaissance College had 900 primary and secondary students, of which 340 were transferred from Phoenix International School.

The school was granted the status of IB World School in 2007. It is known as a selective school with an acceptance rate of less than 4%.

Technology
The college partners with Apple Inc., spending HK$60,000 to 80,000 to provide iMacs and MacBooks, and MacBook Pros, running on Mac OS X operating system.  Projectors and Apple TVs are also installed in most classrooms.

Secondary students attending RCHK are required to bring charged laptops to school every day. Laptops can also be borrowed from the school ICT centre (Red Door) during the school day. There is wireless internet connection in the school, allowing students to have access to the internet within the boundaries of RCHK.

Since the summer of 2011, all students from Years 6–11 are required to purchase a Mac laptop computer for their studies. Year 4 and 5 students are loaned Mac laptops which stay in school. Years 12 and 13 students were allowed to use any laptops they have on hand. Years 1–3 students are provided with iPads for their studies. ICT centre provides loaned computers only for students awaiting out of stock order or extended repair time.

Students are also required to bring school issued smart cards. These cards serve as a gateway to other services the school offers. These include borrowing laptops, printing, borrowing books etc. The cards are also used to log attendance. Students are required to "slide into the dm's" of the school which is then logged onto ESF Gateway. From 1 November, E-mail notifications are sent to students to inform them of the exact time that they swiped in. This is in trial stages and will stay in effect until the end of December 2018.

Primary school
The primary section of RCHK, ages 4–11, follows the Primary Years Programme. It consists of 36 classes across Years 1 to 6. There are approximately 870 students and 40 teachers in the primary school. The Acting Head of Primary is Jason Doucette. Classes run from 8:30 am to 3:00 pm, with 185 days in a school year. Lunch lasts 50 minutes (12:10 - 13:00) and recess lasts 20 minutes (9:50 - 10:10). There are 8 periods each day, each period being 40 minutes.

Classrooms for primary school students are located in the school's primary school block, with Years 1 and 2 on the 1st floor, Years 3 and 4 on the 2nd floor, and Years 5 and 6 on the 3rd floor. There is a rooftop for leisure, used during lunch, recess or the occasional PE lesson, as well as a miniature field on the 3rd floor which is mostly used by primary students. Each floor consists of a hub area for each year group which is an indoor area connecting all the classrooms of one specific year level. The hubs are equipped with desktop computers, reading materials, couches, play areas and learning materials, each suited to the specific year level.

Secondary school
The secondary section of RCHK is attended by approximately 1,000 middle and high school students, ages 11 to 18. The middle school, Years 7 to 11, follows the Middle Years Programme, while high school students in Years 12 and 13 undergo the International Baccalaureate Diploma Programme. The secondary school runs from 8:30 am until 3:10 pm from Mondays to Thursdays, and 8:30 am until 1:00 pm on Fridays, with morning breaks from 10:40 am to 11:00 am and lunch breaks from 1:00 pm to 1:50 pm.

In 2014, RCHK was authorised to offer the International Baccalaureate Career-related Programme (IBCP), the fourth IB programme. This was a milestone, as Renaissance College became only the 8th school in the World to offer all four IB programmes and the first in East Asia to offer the IBCP.

Curriculum and uniform
Renaissance College is an English medium international school and an accredited member of the International Baccalaureate (IB).

RCHK is authorised to offer all four IB programmes: Primary Years Programme (PYP), Middle Years Programme (MYP), Diploma Programme (DP), and Career-related Programme (CP).

The school uniform that Years 1–11 wear have always been polo shirts, based on the colours of black, brown and khaki (unless an activity is issued on a specific day). Years 12–13 can wear casual clothing.

References

External links
 Official Website

English Schools Foundation schools
Educational institutions established in 2006
International Baccalaureate schools in Hong Kong
Through Train schools
Association of China and Mongolia International Schools
2006 establishments in Hong Kong